British Library, Add MS 14669, Syriac manuscript of the New Testament, according to the Peshitta version, on parchment. Palaeographically it has been assigned to the 6th century. It contains fragments of the Gospels.

Description 

It contains the text of the Gospel of Mark 14:71.72; 15:3-5.8-11.15.16; 15:17-40; Gospel of Luke 1:1-8 on 3 leaves (11 ½ by 8 ⅜ inches). The writing is in two columns per page, in 21-23 lines per page. The writing is a large, elegant Estrangela.

The manuscript is housed at the British Library (Add MS 14669, fol. 34-36) in London.

See also 

 List of the Syriac New Testament manuscripts
 Other Peshitta manuscripts
 Codex Phillipps 1388
 British Library, Add MS 14455
 British Library, Add MS 14459
 British Library, Add MS 14479
 Sortable articles
 Syriac versions of the Bible
 Biblical manuscript

References

Further reading 

 William Wright, Catalogue of the Syriac manuscripts in the British Museum (1870; reprint: Gorgias Press 2002).

Peshitta manuscripts
6th-century biblical manuscripts
Add. 14669